The LA postcode area, also known as the Lancaster postcode area, is a group of 23 postcode districts in north-west England, within 17 post towns. These cover north Lancashire (including Lancaster, Morecambe and Carnforth), south Cumbria (including Barrow-in-Furness, Kendal, Ulverston, Windermere, Dalton-in-Furness, Millom, Milnthorpe, Sedbergh, Grange-over-Sands, Askam-in-Furness, Kirkby-in-Furness, Broughton-in-Furness, Coniston and Ambleside) and a small part of North Yorkshire.



Coverage
The approximate coverage of the postcode districts:

|-
! LA1
| LANCASTER
| Lancaster, Aldcliffe, Bailrigg
| City of Lancaster
|-
! LA2
| LANCASTER
| Lancaster, Abbeystead, Aldcliffe, Aughton, Austwick, Bailrigg, Bay Horse, Caton, Clapham, Cockerham, Dolphinholme, Ellel, Farleton, Galgate, Glasson Dock, Halton, Hest Bank, High Bentham, Hornby, Quernmore, Tatham, Wharfe
| City of Lancaster, Craven, Wyre
|-
! LA3
| MORECAMBE
| Morecambe, Heysham, Middleton, Overton, Sunderland Point
| City of Lancaster
|-
! LA4
| MORECAMBE
| Morecambe, Torrisholme
| City of Lancaster
|-
! LA5
| CARNFORTH
| Carnforth, Arnside, Silverdale, Warton, Bolton-Le-Sands
| City of Lancaster, South Lakeland
|-
! LA6
| CARNFORTH
| Arkholme, Burton-in-Kendal, Burton in Lonsdale, Cantsfield, Casterton, Ingleton, Ireby, Kirkby Lonsdale, Masongill, Tunstall, Whittington
| City of Lancaster, Craven, South Lakeland
|-
! LA7
| MILNTHORPE
| Milnthorpe, Beetham, Storth, Heversham
| South Lakeland
|-
! LA8
| KENDAL
| Kendal, Brigsteer, Grayrigg, Levens, Sedgwick, Sizergh
| South Lakeland, Eden
|-
! LA9
| KENDAL
| Kendal, Burneside, Natland, Oxenholme
| South Lakeland
|-
! LA10
| SEDBERGH
| Sedbergh, Dent
| South Lakeland, Craven, Eden
|-
! LA11
| GRANGE-OVER-SANDS
| Grange-over-Sands, Allithwaite, Cark, Cartmel, Field Broughton, High Newton, Lindale, Low Newton, Meathop and Ulpha, Witherslack
| South Lakeland
|-
! LA12
| ULVERSTON
| Ulverston, Aldingham, Backbarrow, Gleaston, Haverthwaite, Leece, Lindal-in-Furness, Newbiggin (Furness), Newby Bridge, Staveley-in-Cartmel, Urswick
| South Lakeland, Barrow-in-Furness
|-
! LA13
| BARROW-IN-FURNESS
| Barrow-in-Furness, Newton-in-Furness, Piel Island, Rampside, Roa Island, Stainton with Adgarley
| Barrow-in-Furness, South Lakeland
|-
! LA14
| BARROW-IN-FURNESS
| Barrow-in-Furness, Walney Island
| Barrow-in-Furness
|-
! style="background:#FFFFFF;"|LA14
| style="background:#FFFFFF;"|DALTON-IN-FURNESS
| style="background:#FFFFFF;"|
| style="background:#FFFFFF;"|non-geographic
|-
! LA15
| DALTON-IN-FURNESS
| Dalton-in-Furness
| Barrow-in-Furness
|-
! LA16
| ASKAM-IN-FURNESS
| Askam-in-Furness
| Barrow-in-Furness
|-
! LA17
| KIRKBY-IN-FURNESS
| Kirkby-in-Furness
| South Lakeland
|-
! LA18
| MILLOM
| Millom
| Copeland
|-
! LA19
| MILLOM
| Millom, Waberthwaite, Bootle
| Copeland
|-
! LA20
| BROUGHTON-IN-FURNESS
| Broughton-in-Furness
| South Lakeland, Copeland
|-
! LA21
| CONISTON
| Coniston, Torver
| South Lakeland
|-
! LA22
| AMBLESIDE
| Ambleside, Chapel Stile, Elterwater, Grasmere, Hawkshead, Near Sawrey, Skelwith Bridge
| South Lakeland
|-
! LA23
| WINDERMERE
| Windermere, Bowness-on-Windermere, Troutbeck
| South Lakeland
|}

Map

See also
Postcode Address File
List of postcode areas in the United Kingdom

References

External links
Royal Mail's Postcode Address File
A quick introduction to Royal Mail's Postcode Address File (PAF)

City of Lancaster
Postcode areas covering North West England
Postcode areas covering Yorkshire and the Humber
Lancashire-related lists